The  is a collection of sketches of various subjects by the Japanese artist Hokusai. Subjects of the sketches include landscapes, flora and fauna, everyday life and the supernatural. 

The word manga in the title does not refer to the contemporary story-telling manga, as the sketches in the work are not connected to each other. Block-printed in three colours (black, gray and pale flesh), the Manga comprise thousands of images in fifteen volumes, the first published in 1814, when the artist was 55. 

The final three volumes were published posthumously, two of them assembled by their publisher from previously unpublished material. The final volume was made up of previously published works, some not even by Hokusai, and is not considered authentic by art historians.

Publication history
Part of the preface reads:

The final volume is considered spurious by some art historians.

The initial publication is usually credited to Eirakuya Toshiro (永楽屋東四郎) of Nagoya whose publishing house was renamed to Eito Shoten in 1914.

Sources of the Manga

The traditional view holds that, after the outburst of production, Hokusai carefully selected and redrew the sketches, arranging them into the patterns we see today. However, Michener (1958:30-34) argues that the pattern of the images on a particular plate were arranged by the wood carvers and publishers, not by the artist himself.

Legacy
The first volume of 'Manga' (Defined by Hokusai as 'Brush gone wild'), was an art instruction book published to aid his troubled finances.  Shortly after he removed the text and republished it.  The Manga evidence a dedication to artistic realism in portrayal of people and the natural world. The work was an immediate success, and the subsequent volumes soon followed. The work became known to the West since Philipp Franz von Siebold's lithographed paraphrases of some of the sketches appeared in his Nippon: Archiv Zur Beschreibung von Japon in 1831. The work began to circulate in the West soon after Matthew C. Perry's entry into Japan in 1854.

Notes

References
Bouquillard, Jocelyn and Marquet, Christopher (2007). Nash, Liz trans. Hokusai: First Manga Master. New York: Harry N. Abrams, Inc. .
Hillier, Jack R. (1980). The Art of Hokusai in Book Illustration. London: Sotheby Parke Bernet; Berkeley, Calif.: University of California Press.
Michener, James A. (1958). Hokusai Sketchbooks: Selections from the Manga. Rutland, Vermont & Tokyo: Charles E. Tuttle Company.
'The Floating World of Hokusai': BBC Radio 4, broadcast 10:30am (UTC) 30 Aug 2012.

External links

 All volumes at The Pulverer Collection (in English)

 All volumes at the Bibliothèque de l'Institut National d'Histoire de l'Art, Paris, France 
 Hokusai's Ukiyo print world  

Works by Hokusai
Manga